Friis & Moltke is a Danish architectural practice headquartered in Aarhus with branch offices in Copenhagen and Aalborg. Friis & Moltke has about 50 employees and is mainly active in the Scandinavian market. The firm was founded in 1955 by the architects Knud Friis and Elmar Moltke Nielsen who met while working at C. F. Møller Architects in Aarhus. Today the company has 6 partners and 1 associated partner responsible for the department of furniture design.

Selected projects
Friis & Moltke has designed many celebrated buildings across Denmark. The projects covers a multitude of functionalities including residential, educational, stadiums, churches, shopping malls, prisons, city halls, concert halls and hotels. A selection of the most notable comprise the following:

Aarhus 
 Hotel Marselis, 1967
 Scanticon, Skåde, 1969
 Risskov Gymnasium, 1969
 Grøfthøjhuset, Viby J, 1970
 Nordgårdskolen, Brabrand, 1970 (demolished 2014)
 Vestervang, 1970
 Skjoldhøj Kollegiet, 1973
 Ellevang Church, 1974
 Langkær Gymnasium, Tilst, 1975
 Skjoldhøj Church, 1983
 Skelager Church, 1990
 Scandinavian Center, 1992

Near Aarhus
 Odder City Hall, Odder, 1971
 Skanderborg Gymnasium, Skanderborg, 1973
 Silkeborg Gymnasium, Silkeborg, 1977

Aalborg 
 Aalborg Stadion, 2002
 University College Nordjylland, 2003
 Gigantium, 2005
 Musikkens Hus, 2014

Zealand 
 Vordingborg Uddannelsescenter, Vordingborg 1980
 Grønnevang Church, Hillerød, 2008

Other places 
 Vestjydsk Handelsskole, Skjern, 1965
 Hotel Lakolk, Rømø, 1966
 Entreprenørskolen, Ebeltoft, 1968
 Viborg Gymnasium og HF, Viborg, 1974
 Hotel Nyborg Strand, Nyborg, 1977
 Radisson SAS H.C. Andersen Hotel, Odense, 1980
 Morsø Rådhus, Nykøbing Mors, 1980
 Herning Kongrescenter, Herning, 1982
 Øer Maritime Ferieby, Ebeltoft, 1988
 Statsfængslet Østjylland, Horsens, 2001
 Holstebro Police Station, Holstebro, 2016

Friis & Moltke has been notable architects of the so-called brutalist architecture, a specific branch of the much broader modernist movement. Brutalism had its heyday in the 1960s and 70s, and noteworthy examples from Friis & Moltke includes Hotel Lakolk, Entreprenørskolen, Scanticon Skåde and Odder City Hall in particular. Outside Denmark, the Siemens Global Leadership Center, and associated guest hotel, from 1974 is a prize-winning example of Friis & Moltke's architecture of the brutalist era.

Outside Denmark 
Friis & Moltke is also active outside Denmark with notable and prize-winning architecture:

 Embassy of Denmark in Ankara (1970), Ankara, Turkey
 Siemens Global Leadership Center (1974), Feldafing, Germany
 Alter Hafen (2011), Wismar, Germany 
 Dublin Waste to Energy (2017), Poolbeg Peninsula, Ireland
 Strømme Senter (in 2019), Kristiansand, Norway
 Ny Anstalt i Nuuk (in 2019), Nuuk, Greenland

Gallery 
60's and 70's

80's and 90's

2000's

References

Publications

External links 

 
 

Architecture firms of Denmark
Companies based in Aarhus
Danish companies established in 1955
Design companies established in 1955